Calliostoma metivieri is a species of sea snail, a marine gastropod mollusk in the family Calliostomatidae.

Some authors place this taxon in the subgenus Calliostoma (Fautor)

Description

Distribution
This marine species occurs off New Caledonia at depths between 390 m and 535 m.

References

 Marshall, B.A. (1995). Calliostomatidae (Gastropoda: Trochoidea) from New Caledonia, the Loyalty Islands and the northern Lord Howe Rise. pp. 381–458 in Bouchet, P. (ed.). Résultats des Campagnes MUSORSTOM, Vol. 14 . Mem. Mus. natn. Hist. nat. 167 : 381-458

External links

metivieri
Gastropods described in 1995